Jeffrey Steven White (born September 2, 1945) is a Senior United States district judge of the United States District Court for the Northern District of California.

Early life, education, and career
Born in New York City, New York, White received a Bachelor of Arts degree from Queens College, City University of New York in 1967 and a Juris Doctor from the University at Buffalo Law School in 1970. He was an attorney in the Criminal Division of the United States Department of Justice from 1970 to 1971 and again from 1977 to 1978, serving in the interim as an Assistant United States Attorney for the United States District Court for the District of Maryland. He was in private practice in San Francisco, California from 1978 to 2002.

Federal judicial service
On July 25, 2002, White was nominated by President George W. Bush to a seat on the United States District Court for the Northern District of California vacated by Charles A. Legge. White was confirmed by the United States Senate on November 14, 2002. He received commission on November 15, 2002. He assumed senior status on February 1, 2021.

Global Warming ruling
In 2005, White allowed environmental groups and four municipalities to go forward with a lawsuit against federal agencies.  The basis for the lawsuit was a claim that the federal government is contributing to global warming by funding various overseas projects.

Glyphosate-resistant sugar beet regulation
In 2009, White ruled that the federal government agency USDA-APHIS had violated Federal Law in deregulating glyphosate-resistant sugar beet without adequately evaluating the environmental and socio-economic impacts of allowing commercial production. On August 13, 2010, Judge White revoked the deregulation of glyphosate-resistant sugar beet in the Spring of 2011. As a result of this ruling, growers were permitted to harvest and process their crop at the end of the 2010 growing season, yet a ban on new plantings was enacted. After the ruling, glyphosate-resistant sugar beet could not be planted until the USDA-APHIS filed an Environmental Impact Statement (EIR). the purpose of the EIR is to determine if environmental issues have negative impacts on the environment, and it may take two to three years to complete the study. After the EIR statement is completed, USDA-APHIS may petition to deregulate glyphosate-resistant sugar beet.

Immediately after Judge White's ruling, USDA-APHIS prepared an Environmental Assessment seeking partial deregulation of glyphosate-resistant sugar beet. The Assessment was filed based on a request received from Monsanto and KWS SAAT AG, a German seed company. Both companies, as well as the sugar beet industry employees and growers, believed a sugar shortage would occur if glyphosate-resistant sugar beet could not be planted. As a response to this concern, USDA-APHIS developed three options in the Environmental Assessment to address the concerns of environmentalists, as well as those raised by the industry. The first option was to not plant glyphosate-resistant sugar beet until the Environmental Impact Statement was completed. The second option was to allow growers to plant glyphosate-resistant sugar beet if they obtained a USDA-APHIS permit and followed specific mandates. Under the third and final option, glyphosate-resistant sugar beet would be partially deregulated but monitored by Monsanto and KWS SSAT AG. USDA-APHIS preferred the second option. They placed the Environmental Assessment in the Federal Register on November 4, 2010, and received a public comment for thirty days.

On February 4, 2011, the USDA-APHIS announced glyphosate-resistant sugar beet had been partially deregulated and growers would be allowed to plant seed from spring 2011 until an Environmental Impact Statement is completed. USDA-APHIS developed requirements that growers must follow if handling glyphosate-resistant sugar beet and will monitor growers throughout the partial deregulation period. The requirements are classified into categories which include planting glyphosate-resistant sugar beet for seed production, planting for sugar production, and transporting sugar beet across state lines. Failure to follow the requirements set by USDA-APHIS may result in civil or criminal charges and destruction of the crop. In July 2012, after completing an Environmental Impact Assessment and a Plant Pest Risk Assessment the USDA deregulated Monsanto's Roundup Ready sugar beets.

Wikileaks ruling
In February 2008, White shut down the ISP for the American mirror of the Website WikiLeaks. The basis for this action was a claim by the Swiss banking group Julius Baer. On February 18, 2008, White approved an agreement between Dynadot and Baer (an injunction based on stipulation);
this action garnered news coverage around the world.

This order was widely criticized as both improper (prior restraint is generally prohibited by the First Amendment) and ineffective (Wikileaks' web servers are in Sweden, and numerous mirrors exist).

White vacated the injunction on February 29, 2008, citing First Amendment concerns and questions about legal jurisdiction. Wikileaks was thus able to bring its site online again. The bank dropped the case on March 5, 2008. The judge also denied the bank's request for an order prohibiting the website's publication.

The Executive Director of the Reporters Committee for Freedom of the Press, Lucy Dalglish, commented: "It's not very often a federal judge does a 180-degree turn in a case and dissolves an order. But we're very pleased the judge recognized the constitutional implications in this prior restraint."

Defense of Marriage Act
In 2012, White ruled in favour of a staff attorney in the 9th Circuit Court of Appeals who sued to get health benefits for her spouse under California law. In his ruling he struck down the Defense of Marriage Act for failing even the most deferential rational basis test.

References

External links

1945 births
Living people
Assistant United States Attorneys
California lawyers
Judges of the United States District Court for the Northern District of California
Lawyers from New York City
Queens College, City University of New York alumni
University at Buffalo alumni
University at Buffalo Law School alumni
United States district court judges appointed by George W. Bush
21st-century American judges
Recipients of the National Intelligence Distinguished Service Medal